Santos Juliá Díaz (16 September 1940 – 23 October 2019) was a Spanish historian and sociologist.

Biography 
Born in Ferrol in 1940, he spent some of his first years in Vigo, moving soon to Seville, where he studied at the Instituto San Isidoro. He took studies in Theology, but graduated in Sociology. He was a strong admirer of Manuel Azaña.

Juliá joined the Universidad Nacional de Educación a Distancia (UNED) as lecturer in 1979, earning a PhD in Political Science and Sociology at the Complutense University of Madrid with a dissertation elaborated in the 1980s. Since 1980, Juliá wrote pieces as columnist for El País. He obtained the Chair of Social History and Political Thought at the UNED in 1989. He died on 23 October 2019 in Majadahonda (Madrid).

Works

References 
Informational notes

Citations

Spanish sociologists
20th-century Spanish historians
Complutense University of Madrid alumni
1940 births
Academic staff of the National University of Distance Education
2019 deaths
Historians of the Spanish transition to democracy
Historians of the Second Spanish Republic
20th-century Spanish male writers
21st-century Spanish historians
21st-century Spanish male writers
Spanish male non-fiction writers
Historians of the labour movement in Spain